Kimneo Haokip Hangshing is an Indian politician and a member of Manipur Legislative Assembly from Saikul representing Kuki People's Alliance since March 2022.

Personal life 
Kimneo Haokip Hangshing is the daughter of Ngamthang Haokip, former BJP MLA from Saitu and is married to David Hangshing, Chairman of a Militant group Kuki Revolutionary Army.

References 

Manipur MLAs 2022–2027
Year of birth missing (living people)
Manipur politicians
Living people